Marko Ćosić (born 2 March 1994) is a Croatian footballer who plays as a defender for Maltese side Gżira United.

Club career
Born in Zagreb, Ćosić came through the youth ranks and started his professional career at NK Inter Zaprešić. A former youth international, he made his first-team and Prva HNL debut on 23 July 2011 in a 2–0 away loss to GNK Dinamo Zagreb, coming in the 77th minute for Stjepan Babić. Nevertheless, he continued on playing for the U-19 team, featuring only sporadically, until the club's relegation to the Druga HNL in the summer of 2013 when he became a first-team regular. His team achieved promotion after two seasons, and during the following 2015–16 Prva HNL season Ćosić was the team captain.

On 16 June 2016, Ćosić made a transfer to Hajduk Split for an undisclosed fee. Ćosić picked the number 44 kit. Ćosić made his Hajduk debut in a 2–2 away draw against CSMS Iași in the second round of 2016–17 UEFA Europa League qualifying, playing the full 90 minutes. Ćosić scored his first Hajduk goal in the 3rd round of 2016–17 UEFA Europa League qualifying, scoring the first in a 3–0 win over FC Oleksandriya at CSC Nika Stadium.

Ćosić signed with Slovenian PrvaLiga club NK Rudar Velenje on 23 January 2019 until June 2020.

External links

Marko Ćosić at Sportnet.hr

References

1994 births
Living people
Footballers from Zagreb
Association football central defenders
Croatian footballers
Croatia youth international footballers
NK Inter Zaprešić players
HNK Hajduk Split players
FK Haugesund players
NK Rudar Velenje players
Hapoel Afula F.C. players
NK Rudeš players
NK Hrvatski Dragovoljac players
Gżira United F.C. players
Croatian Football League players
First Football League (Croatia) players
Eliteserien players
Slovenian PrvaLiga players
Liga Leumit players
Maltese Premier League players
Croatian expatriate footballers
Expatriate footballers in Norway
Croatian expatriate sportspeople in Norway
Expatriate footballers in Slovenia
Croatian expatriate sportspeople in Slovenia
Expatriate footballers in Israel
Croatian expatriate sportspeople in Israel
Expatriate footballers in Malta
Croatian expatriate sportspeople in Malta